The 1965 Campeonato Paulista de Futebol da Divisão Especial de Profissionais, organized by the Federação Paulista de Futebol, was the 64th season of São Paulo's top professional football league. Santos won the title for the 9th time. Ferroviária and XV de Piracicaba were relegated and the top scorer was Santos's Pelé with 49 goals.

Championship
The championship was disputed in a double-round robin system, with the team with the most points winning the title and the two teams with the fewest points being relegated.

Top Scores

References

Campeonato Paulista seasons
Paulista